{{safesubst:#invoke:RfD|||month = March
|day = 13
|year = 2023
|time = 18:01
|timestamp = 20230313180148

|content=
REDIRECT Aspy Bay

}}